Grigor Dimitrov defeated Kei Nishikori in the final, 6–2, 2–6, 6–3 to win the men's singles tennis title at the 2017 Brisbane International.

Milos Raonic was the defending champion, but lost in the semifinals to Dimitrov.

Seeds
The top four seeds receive a bye into the second round.

Draw

Finals

Top half

Bottom half

Qualifying

Seeds

Qualifiers

Qualifying draw

First qualifier

Second qualifier

Third qualifier

Fourth qualifier

References
 Main Draw
 Qualifying Draw

Men's Singles
2017 ATP World Tour